Enrique Gómez "Kike" Hermoso (born 10 August 1999) is a Spanish footballer who plays as a central defender for Portuguese club Vilafranquense.

Club career
Hermoso was born in Madrid, and joined Rayo Vallecano's youth setup in 2017 from Alcobendas CF. He made his senior debut with the reserves on 2 September of that year, starting in a 2–0 Tercera División home win against RSD Alcalá.

Hermoso scored his first senior goal on 12 November 2017, netting the opener in a 4–1 home routing of CD Los Yébenes San Bruno. On 9 July 2019, he moved to SD Huesca and was assigned to the farm team in Segunda División B.

Hermoso made his professional debut on 18 August 2019, starting in a 1–0 away defeat of UD Las Palmas. On 1 October of the following year, he moved to another reserve team, Betis Deportivo Balompié in the third division.

Career statistics

Club

References

External links

1999 births
Footballers from Madrid
Living people
Spanish footballers
Association football defenders
Rayo Vallecano B players
SD Ejea players
SD Huesca footballers
Betis Deportivo Balompié footballers
Real Betis players
U.D. Vilafranquense players
La Liga players
Segunda División players
Primera Federación players
Segunda División B players
Tercera División players
Liga Portugal 2 players
Spanish expatriate footballers
Expatriate footballers in Portugal
Spanish expatriate sportspeople in Portugal